Iowa's 6th congressional district is a former U.S. congressional district in the State of Iowa. It existed in elections from 1862 to 1992, when it was lost due to Iowa's population growth rate being lower than that of the country as a whole.

The district was created during the Civil War; it was first filled in the 1862 general election. Its original representative, Asahel W. Hubbard, was from Sioux City in Northwestern Iowa, but redistricting caused the district to be relocated, first to central Iowa (from 1869 to 1874), then to south-central Iowa (from 1875 to 1932), then the Des Moines area (from 1933 to 1942) and then north-central Iowa (from 1943 to 1962). From 1963 to 1992, the district was made up of counties in the northwestern part of the state. Fred Grandy, the 6th district's last representative, was, like its first, a Sioux City native.

List of members representing the district 

The district was eliminated as a result of the 1990 census. All of the district was put in the fifth district except for Cerro Gordo county which was put in the 2nd district.

General election history (from 1920)

See also
 List of United States representatives from Iowa
 Iowa's congressional districts

References

 Congressional Biographical Directory of the United States 1774–present

06
Former congressional districts of the United States
1863 establishments in Iowa
1993 disestablishments in Iowa